Matias Cardoso is a municipality in the north of the state of Minas Gerais in Brazil.

Location
Matias Cardoso is located on the right bank of the São Francisco River.  It is 10 km. south of  Manga and is 72 km. northwest of Jaíba. 
As of 2020 the population was 11,260 in an area of 1,938 km2.  
The elevation of the municipal seat is 472 meters.  
It became a municipality in 1993  
The postal code (CEP) is 39478-000
Statistical microregion:  Januária
 
The municipality contains the  Jaíba Biological Reserve, a fully protected conservation unit created in 1994.

Economy
The economy is based on agriculture with emphasis on cattle raising.  There were 46,000 head in 2006.  The main agricultural crops were cotton, peanuts, corn, manioc, sorghum, sugarcane, and mamona—castor oil plant.  The GDP was R$37,034,000 in 2005.

Health

This municipality is extremely isolated from major population centers and suffers from drought and poor soils.  It is one of the poorest in the state and in the country.  
Municipal Human Development Index: .602 (2000)
State ranking: 831 out of 853 municipalities as of 2000
National ranking: 4,618 out of 5,138 municipalities as of 2000
(For the complete list see Frigoletto)
Illiteracy rate: 32.51% (older than 16)--the rate for the state was 11.96% (2000)
Infant mortality rate: 12.20—the rate for the state was 17.40 (2000)
Urbanization rate: 43%--the rate for the state was 80% (2000)
Urban area connected to sewers: 2.4%--the state percentage was 81.39% (2000)
Urban area with garbage collection: 34.06%--the state percentage was 91.37 (2000)
Health clinics: 4

References

IBGE
CARDOSO.pdf

See also
List of municipalities in Minas Gerais

Municipalities in Minas Gerais